Carol Mendelsohn (born 1951) is an American television producer, showrunner, and screenwriter, known for her work on the crime drama CSI: Crime Scene Investigation.

Education
Mendelsohn grew up in Chicago, where her father was an attorney. She attended the Latin School of Chicago. Also she went to Smith College, but later transferred and in 1973 graduated from Cornell University. She then went to the George Washington University Law School and practiced at the Washington, D.C., office of the prominent Los Angeles-based firm Wyman, Bautzer, Rothman, & Kuchel. She also worked for the U.S. Securities and Exchange Commission.

Film and television career
Realizing that she did not want to be a lawyer, she enrolled in an American Film Institute class. She moved to Los Angeles and started writing for the movie industry. Her early work included contributions to Hardcastle and McCormick, Stingray and Wiseguy. As producer for Cannell Studios, she worked on The Trials of Rosie O'Neill and Melrose Place.

In 2000, Mendelsohn joined the production of CSI: Crime Scene Investigation and became its show runner and executive producer. In the fall of 2003, new long-term contracts made Mendelsohn and Ann Donahue "the two highest-paid female writers in television drama."

In June 2014, it was announced that after 14 years Mendelsohn would leave CSI.

She was also co-creator and executive producer of CSI: Miami, CSI: NY and CSI: Cyber. In 2008, she wrote the episode "Fish in a Drawer" for Two and a Half Men. It is reported that she signed a deal with Universal in 2018.

In 2022, she signed a first-look deal with Fox Entertainment.

Awards and nominations
As part of the CSI team, she was nominated for the Writers Guild of America Award, the Producers Guild of America Award (twice), the Emmy Award (three times) and the Edgar Award.

References

External links 

 
 "Cornell alumni makes 'CSI' television's most-watched show", article on the Cornell University website
 In the Company of Women, article on the Writers Guild of America website

1951 births
American soap opera writers
Television producers from Illinois
American women television producers
Cornell University alumni
Latin School of Chicago alumni
Living people
Writers from Chicago
American women television writers
Showrunners
George Washington University Law School alumni
Women soap opera writers
Screenwriters from Illinois
Screenwriters from Washington, D.C.
20th-century American screenwriters
20th-century American women writers
21st-century American screenwriters
21st-century American women writers